Homorosoma sulcipenne is a species of minute seed weevil in the beetle family Curculionidae.

References

Further reading

External links

 

Curculionidae
Beetles described in 1876